Kim Yoo-bin (born January 14, 2005) is a South Korean actress.

Filmography

Film

Television series

Awards and nominations

References

External links
 
 
 

2005 births
Living people
South Korean television actresses
South Korean film actresses
South Korean child actresses